Amir Sultan or Emir Sultan (b. 1368 AD/770 AH, Bukhara - d. 1429, Bursa) was a well-known thinker in the world of Islam and mysticism (tasawwuf), who lived in Bursa during the early period of the Ottoman Empire. He was Amir Kulal Shamsuddin's grandson.

Biography 
Emir Sultan's name is Muhammad bin Ali and his nickname is Shamsuddin. He was born in Bukhara and immigrated to Bursa in 1391 following an invitation from the Ottoman Sultan Bayezid the Thunderbolt to move to Anatolia. Bayezid I had a daughter named Hundi Fatema Sultan Hatun from his marriage with Daulat Khatun (Devletshah Hatun) who was married to Amir Sultan. Daulat Khatun was a descendant of Jalal ud-Din Rumi. Emir Sultan's lineage goes back to Sayyidna Hussein, the grandson of the Prophet Muhammad. He was called "Muhammed Bukhari" because he was born in Bukhara, "Emir Bukhari" because he was a Sayyid, and "Emir Sultan" because he was dear to people's hearts - sultan of hearts - and after he became the son-in-law of Sultan Bayezid I.

Bayezid I and Timur 
By the end of fourteenth century Timur and Bayezid I had emerged as two superpowers in Asia and Europe, making the confrontation between two a matter of time. Timur took the lead and conquered the Ottoman city of Sivas, disseminating the local population in his trademark style. At the same time two princes, Ahmad Jalayir (Jalayirids) and Kara Yosuf (Qara Yusuf) sought for protection at Bayezid I's court. Their territories had been conquered by Timur. Timur sent two embassies demanding surrender of the two princes, but Bayezid I refused. Bayezid I went a step further and prepared for an attack on Timur's territory. At this point his son-in-law Amir Sultan advised him against the move knowing well the penchant and proficiency of Timur and his soldiers in a battlefield. However, his genteel council fell on deaf ears. Instigated and incited by the two princes Bayezid I seized Erzurum which was under Timur's rule. To Timur this was declaration of war and in his symbolic manner he started conquering Ottoman cities one by one with whirlwind speed. Bayezid I took his army to stop Timur and the two goliaths met at the plains of the Battle of Ankara on 20 July 1402 (804AH). Although Bayezid I had made a fierce reputation in Europe as a brilliant general and ferocious warrior but he was no match for Timur whose years in battlefield far exceeded Bayazid's age. The Timurid attack was ruthless and merciless and in one word, Timur “annihilated” the Ottoman army, taking Bayezid I, his children and princes as captives.

Amir Sultan had decided not to be a party of the war. It was because of the family associations with the Barlas tribe he decided not to be associated with either side while the state-of-war lasted between the two sovereigns. It might have been this decision coupled with the fact that his family was regarded as mentors by the Timurid dynasty which meant he did not share the same fate as his in-laws. After the battle Amir Sultan returned to his native soil at Vabkent. His children went to Chinese Turkistan. After Babur established the Mughal Empire his descendants moved to India. Among them Shah Jamal, Shah La’al, Shah Abbas, and Shah Altaf are the notables.

Emir Sultan Mosque 
Emir Sultan died in Bursa in 833 (1430). His tomb (türbe) is in the Emir Sultan Mosque in Bursa.

References

1368 births
1429 deaths
Ottoman people of the Byzantine–Ottoman wars
Bursa